William C. "Bud" Pierce (born October 3, 1956) is an American physician and politician. He was the unsuccessful Republican nominee for Governor of Oregon in the 2016 special election.

Early life and career
Pierce was born in Germany and raised in Riverside County, California. His father worked as a public school custodian and his mother was a homemaker. He graduated from Moreno Valley High School in 1974 and attended college at the University of California, Riverside, graduating in 1979, and medical school at the University of California, Los Angeles, receiving a Ph.D. in 1985 and M.D. in 1987. He served in the United States Marine Corps Reserve from 1979 to 1985, and moved to Salem, Oregon in 1994, where he currently works as an oncologist and hematologist. Pierce is also a clinical assistant professor of medicine at Oregon Health & Science University and College of Osteopathic Medicine of the Pacific, Northwest.

Political career

2016 gubernatorial election
In March 2015, Pierce announced he would explore a campaign for governor. He won the Republican primary for governor on May 17, 2016, and received about 48% of the vote, defeating his closest challenger, businessman Allen Alley, by nearly 20 points. Pierce faced incumbent Governor Kate Brown in the general election in November.

In May 2016, Pierce endorsed Republican presidential nominee Donald Trump. However, in September he released a statement stating he "was hopeful that Donald Trump would rise to the occasion and unify the party and nation during the general election. As each day goes by, more of the opposite has taken place. At this point in time I need to see more from Donald Trump in the way of specific policy proposals and a more inclusive tone in order to vote for him." Following the release of video footage showing Donald Trump making lewd comments about women, Pierce condemned the comments, stating, "Mr. Trump's comments are degrading, unbecoming, and unacceptable, period."

In September 2016, during a debate with Kate Brown, Pierce generated controversy and boos from the audience for saying educated women are less susceptible to domestic abuse. He later apologized for his remarks.

On November 8, 2016, Pierce lost to Brown, receiving 43% of the vote.

2022 gubernatorial election
On November 30, 2020, Pierce announced he would be once again running for Governor in the 2022 election. In his announcement, he criticized Governor Brown (who was term limited in 2022), saying, "Oregon is currently suffering under the guidance of an oppressive and poorly performing governor."

Political positions
Pierce opposed Oregon Ballot Measure 97 in 2016. It would have imposed a gross receipts tax on C Corporations with sales exceeding $25 million. In 2016, Pierce called for a more moderate Oregon Republican Party.

He is against vaccine mandates saying in February 2022, regarding COVID-19 deaths, "Most of those were 65 and over, past working age. Few people of working age have died, and society shouldn’t be brought to a halt." "It’s time to end the mandates."

Personal life
Pierce married Selma Moon Pierce on June 6, 1981. The couple had two children. They attend Salem First Christian Church in Salem, Oregon. Selma Pierce was also involved in politics; she ran for Oregon's 20th House district in 2018 and 2020, losing both times to Democrat Paul Evans. Selma died after being struck by a car in Salem in 2020.

Electoral history

References

1956 births
21st-century American physicians
21st-century American politicians
Candidates in the 2016 United States elections
Living people
American oncologists
Oregon Republicans
Physicians from Oregon
University of California, Los Angeles alumni
University of California, Riverside alumni
Politicians from Salem, Oregon